Guangfu Township is a rural township located in mid Huatung Valley between Central Mountain Range and coastal Range of Hualien County, Taiwan. The indigenous Amis people make up about half of the population. The main economical activity is agriculture.

Geography

The township is located at the Huatung Valley.

Administrative divisions
The township has 14 villages with a population of 11,975 inhabitants. Dahua, Daan, Daping, Dama, Datong, Tungfu, Xifu, Nanfu, Beifu, Dajin, Daquan, Daxing, Dafu and Dafeng Village.

Tourist attractions

 Bao'an Temple
 Dafong Ecological Park
 Danongdafu Forest Park
 Daxing Waterfall Memorial Park
 Hualien Sugar Factory
 Mataian Culture Street
 Mataian Humanities Studio
 Matai'an Wetland Ecological Park
 Mudflow Memorial Park
 Tabalong aboriginal culture

Transportation

 Taiwan Railways Administration Guangfu and Dafu Station (Taitung line)
 Provincial Highway No.9 (Hualien-Taitung Provincial Highway)
 Provincial Highway No.11A (Guangfu-Fengbin)
 County Road No.193

Notable natives
 Lin Chiung-ying, football and futsal player

References

External links

 Guangfu Township Administration Office

Townships in Hualien County